The Miami Marlins Radio Network is a network of 8 radio stations in Florida that broadcast Major League Baseball games of the Miami Marlins for the 2022 season. 7 stations broadcast games in English, while another carries a separate broadcast in Spanish. Some stations are simulcast on HD Radio digital multicast channels and/or FM translators. The English announcers are Glenn Geffner on play-by-play and J.P. Arencibia, Gaby Sanchez, and Kelly Saco as the color analyst team, with Kyle Sielaff as host and reporter. On the Spanish broadcast, Luis "Yiki" Quintana provides play-by-play and commentary joined by Jose Napoles for home games and Alberto Ferreiro for road games.

Flagships

Affiliates

See also
List of XM Satellite Radio channels
List of Sirius Satellite Radio stations

References

Miami Marlins
Major League Baseball on the radio
Sports radio networks in the United States